Vibank is a village in the Canadian province of Saskatchewan within the Rural Municipality of Francis No. 127 and Census Division No. 6.

Wascana Creek originates near the community. Fish species in the creek include walleye, yellow perch, northern pike, white sucker and burbot.

History 
Vibank incorporated as a village on June 23, 1911.

Demographics 

Notable people 
Joe Erautt, a former Major League Baseball player, was a native of Vibank.

See also 
 Village of Vibank
 List of communities in Saskatchewan
 Villages of Saskatchewan

References

Villages in Saskatchewan
Francis No. 127, Saskatchewan
Division No. 6, Saskatchewan